Michael Stephen Brown (born 1987 in Oceanside, NY) is an American classical pianist and composer. He is the recipient of the 2015 Avery Fisher Career Grant, 2018 Emerging Artist Award from Lincoln Center, and the 2010 Concert Artists Guild Competition. Brown has performed as soloist with the Seattle, Grand Rapids, North Carolina, Maryland and Albany symphony orchestras, and at Carnegie Hall, Caramoor, the Smithsonian, Alice Tully Hall, and the Gilmore Festival. He is an artist at the Chamber Music Society of Lincoln Center, and is a former member of CMS Two (now known as The Bowers Program). He regularly performs duo recitals with cellist Nicholas Canellakis.

Michael Stephen Brown is also a composer and is the recipient of the 2018 Copland House Residency Award.

Michael Stephen Brown is a graduate of the Juilliard School, where he studied piano with Jerome Lowenthal and Robert McDonald, and composition with Samuel Adler (composer) and Robert Beaser.

References 

1987 births
American classical composers
American classical pianists
American male classical composers
American male classical pianists
Classical musicians from New York (state)
Juilliard School alumni
Living people
People from Oceanside, New York